Secret Swingers is an album by the American indie rock band Versus, released in 1996.

Production
The band added a second guitar player, James Baluyut, prior to the Secret Swingers recordings sessions.
The album was produced by Nicolas Vernhes, and was recorded over a month and a half.

Critical reception

The Nashville Banner called the album "derivative of Sonic Youth," but wrote that "Versus still manages to bring its fair share of ideas to the table." The Village Voice deemed it "as 'original' as guitar-bass-drums-vocals indie-rock music gets," declaring that "with equal boy and girl intensity, and ecstatic, near-schizophrenic tempo/volume changes, Versus have forged that rare commodity: a 'sound'." The Sunday Times praised Fontaine Toups, writing that she "supplies the kind of motorised bass parts New Order's Peter Hook wouldn't have been ashamed of." 

AllMusic called the album "a superbly textured set more consistent and eclectic than anything else the band has done to date." Magnet wrote that "Secret Swingers may not have been revolutionary, but like a good inside joke between friends, it stuck around." Reviewing the band's 2010 album, On the Ones and Threes, Pitchfork thought that Versus' two Caroline releases "sound as close as most any other records to a definitive indie rock sound."

Track listing

References

1996 albums
Caroline Records albums